Rachael Helen Maskell (born 5 July 1972) is a British politician serving as Member of Parliament (MP) for York Central since 2015. A member of the Labour and Co-operative parties, she was Shadow Environment Secretary from 2016 to 2017 and Shadow Employment Secretary in 2020. She is a member of the Socialist Campaign Group parliamentary caucus.

Background
Maskell was born in Winchester, Hampshire in South East England and was brought up in Highcliffe on the border between Dorset and Hampshire. She was influenced to take up an interest in politics by her uncle Terence Morris, a close associate of Louis Blom-Cooper, who was a professor of criminology and criminal justice at the London School of Economics. Morris had campaigned for the abolition of the death penalty, in addition to serving as an advisor to the Wilson government and as an academic. The Yorker, a York-based student publication, states: "[he] preferred to live and work amongst his community rather than be without. [H]is approach to politics was her inspiration as a child".

Maskell graduated from the University of East Anglia with a degree in physiotherapy in 1994. She worked as a care-worker and physiotherapist in the National Health Service for 20 years in Norwich and the London Borough of Barnet. Maskell has also been a trade-union official.

Politics
In 2006, Maskell stood as a Labour candidate for the Blackheath ward in Lewisham, south east London. The election saw the Liberal Democrats gain all three seats from Labour, however.

With the retirement of Hugh Bayley, the Labour MP for York Central, in 2015, the Labour Party selected Maskell to stand in his place for that year's general election, though she had no previous connection to York itself, having spent her life in southern England. She retained the safe seat, which Labour had held since 1992, with 42% of the vote. She was reelected in 2017 and 2019.

Maskell used her maiden speech to advocate for a new mental health hospital in York to replace the ageing Bootham Park. Speaking of the vision of "late member for Ebbw Vale" Aneurin Bevan, she said that "the growing social and financial inequalities manifest themselves in health inequality, and access to vital services is delayed and even denied as a direct result of the £3 billion structural reorganisation that the previous Government introduced."

On Wednesday 8 July 2015, Maskell was one of four Labour MPs elected to the Health Select Committee.

Maskell voted against the Welfare Bill in the House of Commons on 20 July 2015. Maskell made a statement saying "I have a duty to protect our vulnerable people. I could not stand by and let the most vicious Tory attacks on some of the poorest in our city go unchallenged."

In September 2015, during the European refugee crisis, Maskell called on the UK to open its doors to refugees. Speaking as 20,000 refugees arrived in Munich in one weekend, and as the German Government got ready to receive 800,000 refugees in 2015; Maskell said that the UK Government must do more. She questioned David Cameron in the House of Commons asking "what criteria has the Prime Minister used to arrive at a figure of just six refugees per constituency per year?" In a statement on the crisis, she urged local authorities to help in every way they can and use every space they had to offer to aid people fleeing war in Syria and Northern Iraq, she said "we are in the midst of a humanitarian crisis that is getting worse, I am incensed that Turkey is hosting over one and a half million refugees and our government says we will open our borders to no more than six men, women and children a year in each constituency."

Maskell spoke in the Trade-Union Bill 2nd Reading debate on 14 September 2015. She referred the house to her Register of Interests as a member of Unite the Union declared "I am a proud trade-unionist" – she subsequently voted against the Bill.

Following a period working part of the Shadow Defence Team under Shadow Secretary of State for Defence Maria Eagle, Maskell was appointed Shadow Environment, Food and Rural Affairs Secretary as part of the Labour Party's post-Brexit reshuffle. Maskell resigned from her position ahead of the vote on the second reading in the House of Commons European Union (Notification of Withdrawal) Bill 2017 triggering Article 50, which carried a three-line whip imposed on Labour MPs.

She returned to the Labour front bench on 3 July 2017 as Shadow Rail Minister.

On 5 March 2019, Maskell joined a dozen other Labour MPs on Westminster Bridge, next to the Houses of Parliament, in a protest against Brexit under the banner 'Love Socialism Hate Brexit'.

She was one of five Labour MPs to vote against the extension of abortion rights to Northern Ireland. During votes on the same bill, she also abstained on extending same-sex marriage to Northern Ireland.

Maskell endorsed Clive Lewis in the 2020 Labour Party leadership election. In January 2020, Maskell was returned to the Shadow Cabinet as Shadow Secretary of State for Employment Rights, replacing Laura Pidcock who lost her seat in the 2019 general election.

On 14 December 2021, Maskell resigned from her frontbench role in order to defy the party whip by voting against mandatory COVID-19 vaccinations for NHS staff. She also voted in line with the party whip by voting in favour of COVID-19 vaccine passports and an expansion of mask mandates.

On 22 June 2022, Maskell was the only Labour MP to vote against extension of abortion services in Northern Ireland.

Personal life
Maskell is a keen cyclist and rode the trip to Labour Conference 2015 in Brighton from Parliament in aid of the British Heart Foundation.

Notes

References

External links

|-

1972 births
Living people
Politicians from Winchester
21st-century British women politicians
Alumni of the University of East Anglia
Female members of the Parliament of the United Kingdom for English constituencies
Labour Co-operative MPs for English constituencies
Politics of York
UK MPs 2015–2017
UK MPs 2017–2019
UK MPs 2019–present
British physiotherapists